C-X-C chemokine receptor type 4 (CXCR-4) also known as fusin or CD184 (cluster of differentiation 184) is a protein that in humans is encoded by the CXCR4 gene. The protein is a CXC chemokine receptor.

Function 

CXCR-4 is an alpha-chemokine receptor specific for stromal-derived-factor-1 (SDF-1 also called CXCL12), a molecule endowed with potent chemotactic activity for lymphocytes. CXCR4 is one of several chemokine co-receptors that HIV can use to infect CD4+ T cells.  HIV isolates that use CXCR4 are traditionally known as T-cell tropic isolates.  Typically, these viruses are found late in infection.  It is unclear as to whether the emergence of CXCR4-using HIV is a consequence or a cause of immunodeficiency.

CXCR4 is upregulated during the implantation window in natural and hormone replacement therapy cycles in the endometrium, producing, in presence of a human blastocyst, a surface polarization of the CXCR4 receptors suggesting that this receptor is implicated in the adhesion phase of human implantation.

CXCR4's ligand SDF-1 is known to be important in hematopoietic stem cell homing to the bone marrow and in hematopoietic stem cell quiescence. It has been also shown that CXCR4 signalling regulates the expression of CD20 on B cells. Until recently, SDF-1 and CXCR4 were believed to be a relatively monogamous ligand-receptor pair (other chemokines are promiscuous, tending to use several different chemokine receptors).  Recent evidence demonstrates ubiquitin is also a natural ligand of CXCR4.  Ubiquitin is a small (76-amino acid) protein  highly conserved among eukaryotic cells.  It is best known for its intracellular role in targeting ubiquitylated proteins for degradation via the ubiquitin proteasome system.  Evidence in numerous animal models suggests ubiquitin is anti-inflammatory immune modulator and endogenous opponent of proinflammatory damage associated molecular pattern molecules. It is speculated this interaction may be through CXCR4 mediated signalling pathways. MIF is an additional ligand of CXCR4

CXCR4 is present in newly generated neurons during embryogenesis and adult life where it plays a role in neuronal guidance. The levels of the receptor decrease as neurons mature. CXCR4 mutant mice have aberrant neuronal distribution. This has been implicated in disorders such as epilepsy.

CXCR4 dimerization is dynamic and increases with concentration.

Clinical significance 

Drugs that block the CXCR4 receptor appear to be capable of "mobilizing" hematopoietic stem cells into the bloodstream as peripheral blood stem cells. Peripheral blood stem cell mobilization is very important in hematopoietic stem cell transplantation (as a recent  alternative to transplantation of surgically harvested bone marrow) and is currently performed using drugs such as G-CSF. G-CSF is a growth factor for neutrophils (a common type of white blood cells), and may act by increasing the activity of neutrophil-derived proteases such as neutrophil elastase in the bone marrow leading to proteolytic degradation of SDF-1. Plerixafor (AMD3100) is a drug, approved for routine clinical use, which directly blocks the CXCR4 receptor. It is a very efficient inducer of hematopoietic stem cell mobilization in animal and human studies. In a small human clinical trial to evaluate the safety and efficacy of fucoidan ingestion (brown seaweed extract), 3g daily of 75% w/w oral fucoidan for 12 days increased the proportion of CD34+CXCR4+ from 45 to 90% and the serum SDF-1 levels, which could be useful in CD34+ cells homing/mobilization via SDF-1/CXCR4 axis.

It has been associated with WHIM syndrome. WHIM like mutations in CXCR4 were recently identified in patients with Waldenström's macroglobulinemia, a B-cell malignancy. The presence of CXCR4 WHIM mutations has been associated with clinical resistance to ibrutinib in patients with Waldenström's macroglobulinemia.

While CXCR4's expression is low or absent in many healthy tissues, it was demonstrated to be expressed in over 23 types of cancer, including breast cancer, ovarian cancer, melanoma, and prostate cancer. Expression of this receptor in cancer cells has been linked to metastasis to tissues containing a high concentration of CXCL12, such as lungs, liver and bone marrow. However, in breast cancer where SDF1/CXCL12 is also expressed by the cancer cells themselves along with CXCR4, CXCL12 expression is positively correlated with disease free (metastasis free) survival. CXCL12 (over-)expressing cancers might not sense the CXCL12 gradient released from the metastasis target tissues since the receptor, CXCR4, is saturated with the ligand produced in an autocrine manner. Another explanation of this observation is provided by a study that shows the ability of CXCL12 (and  CCL2) producing tumors to entrain neutrophils that inhibit seeding of tumor cells in the lung.

Drug response 
Chronic exposure to THC has been shown to increase T lymphocyte CXCR4 expression on both CD4+ and CD8+ T lymphocytes in rhesus macaques. It has been shown that BCR signalling inhibitors also affect CXCR4 pathway and thus CD20 expression.

Interactions 

CXCR4 has been shown to interact with USP14.

See also 

CXCR4 antagonist
HIV tropism
Entry inhibitor
Discovery and development of CCR5 receptor antagonists

References

Further reading

External links 
 
 
 
 

Chemokine receptors